Harold Winston Forsyth Mejía (born 27 May 1951) is a Peruvian diplomat and former politician who has served as Peru's ambassador to the United States, Italy, Colombia, the People's Republic of China and Japan. From 1995 until 2000, he sat for one term in the Congress of the Republic of Peru.

Early life and education
Harold Forsyth was born to Willy Forsyth and Lucciola Mejia de Forsyth in 1951. He graduated from the Champagnat School in Lima, Peru and received a bachelor's degree in journalism at the Pontifical Catholic University of Peru. Forsyth later earned a graduate certificate at the Diplomatic Academy of Peru.

Career
In his early career, Forsyth held a variety of diplomatic postings to Chile, Venezuela, Canada, and Germany, and was seconded as an international observer to elections monitoring missions in Colombia, Mexico, and Guatemala.

Political career 
Forsyth was compelled to resign from the Peruvian foreign service by Alberto Fujimori and, in the 1995 election, he successfully stood for election to Congress, holding his seat for a single, five-year term under the Union for Peru. During this period he also hosted the program "Convocatoria" on CPN Radio.

Return to Foreign Service 
Later returning to the foreign service, Forsyth served as Peruvian ambassador to Colombia from 2001 to 2004, as ambassador to Italy from 2004 to 2006, as ambassador to China from 2009 to 2011, as ambassador to the United States from 2011 to 2014, and, from 2017 to 2021, as ambassador to Japan. Between his postings to Italy and China, Forsyth returned to Peru, where he served as deputy foreign minister.

Personal life
Forsyth is married and has three children, including footballer-politician George Forsyth. Forsyth's wife, María Verónica, is a former Miss Chile.

Works

References

External links
 Forsyth interviewed in 2012 at YouTube

1951 births
Living people
Peruvian people of Scottish descent
People from Huanta Province
Peruvian diplomats
Ambassadors of Peru to the United States
Ambassadors of Peru to China
Ambassadors of Peru to Colombia
Ambassadors of Peru to Italy
Ambassadors of Peru to Japan
Members of the Congress of the Republic of Peru
Union for Peru politicians